Robert Bromley is a Canadian politician. He represented the electoral district of Weledeh in the Legislative Assembly of the Northwest Territories. He was elected in the 2007 territorial election to succeed Joe Handley, who did not stand for re-election.

References

External links

Members of the Legislative Assembly of the Northwest Territories
Living people
People from Yellowknife
21st-century Canadian politicians
Year of birth missing (living people)